The fourth  season of the Black Clover anime TV series was directed by Ayataka Tanemura and produced by Pierrot. The season premiered on December 8, 2020 on TV Tokyo in Japan, and ended on March 30, 2021. The season started with anime canon episodes supervised by author Yūki Tabata before continuing off with the 24th volume of his manga series of the same name starting on episode 158. Both Crunchyroll and Funimation licensed the series for an English release, with Crunchyroll simulcasting the fourth season, and Funimation producing a North American Simuldub.

The fourth season uses four pieces of theme music: two opening theme and two ending theme. The second opening and ending themes, used for episodes 158 to 170, are "Grandeur" by Snow Man and "BEAUTIFUL" by Treasure.



Episode list

Home media release

Japanese
In Japan, Avex Pictures released the season of the anime on DVD and Blu-ray in one "chapter" volumes, with the sixteenth volume released on June 25, 2021.

English
In North America, Crunchyroll & Funimation released the season on DVD and Blu-ray combination sets. The now-combined company also distributes the series in Australia and New Zealand via Madman Entertainment, and via Manga Entertainment in the United Kingdom and Ireland.

Notes

References

Black Clover episode lists
2020 Japanese television seasons
2021 Japanese television seasons